Andriy Ilyashov is a Ukrainian retired footballer.

Career
He began to play Metalurh-2 Zaporizhzhia and for Metalurh Zaporizhzhia, Mykolaiv, Stal Kamianske. In Ukrainian Premier League, he played 25 matches and scored 2 goals, all for Metalurh. In the First League he played 68 matches and scored 8 goals.

Now he plays for the club Desna Chernihiv the club in the city of Chernihiv, plays under number 23. In 2013 he moved to Avanhard Kramatorsk. In 2014 he moved to Hirnyk Kryvyi Rih for two season where he played 46 matches and scored 16 goals. In 2015, he moved to Kolos Zachepylivka.

References

External links 
 Ильяшов Андрей Степанович at footballfacts.ru
 Andriy Ilyashov at allplayers.in.ua

1982 births
Living people
FC Metalurh Zaporizhzhia players
FC Metalurh-2 Zaporizhzhia players
MFC Mykolaiv players
FC Shakhtar Sverdlovsk players
FC Stal Kamianske players
FC Ihroservice Simferopol players
FC Desna Chernihiv players
FC Kramatorsk players
FC Hirnyk Kryvyi Rih players
Ukrainian footballers
Ukrainian Premier League players
Ukrainian First League players
Ukrainian Second League players
Association football forwards